Al Jalila Children's Specialty Hospital (Al Jalila Children's) is a children's hospital ordered to be built by Mohammed bin Rashid Al Maktoum as a gift to the children of the UAE to celebrate his daughter Al Jalila’s first birthday on 2 December 2008.

History
It was announced in December 2008 that the hospital would be located in Dubai and would have 200 beds. The hospital was designed by Italian architectural firm Studio Altieri International. The contractor assigned for fencing, shoring excavation and piling was A.P.C.C., and the contractor for construction of the facility itself was Al-Futtaim Carillion LLC. It was designed to be a 'smart hospital' that integrates IT and design features to create a positive and entertaining environment for patients and families. It opened in October 2016.

Departments, units and other features 
Departments are as follows:
 Heart Center
 Cancer Center
 Mental Health and Neurology Center
 Pediatric Intensive Care Unit
 Neonatal Intensive Care Unit
 Coronary Intensive Care Unit
 Nephrology Unit
 Kidney Dialysis
 Rehabilitation Unit
 Physiotherapy Unit
 Adolescent Unit
 Imaging and Radiology Department
 Nuclear Medicine
 Clinical Laboratories
 Outpatient Department
 Emergency Department
 Surgery Department with 8 Operating Rooms
 Pulmonology
 Endocrinology
 Developmental Pediatrics
 Gastroenterology
 Allergy & Immunology
 Ophthalmology
 ENT
 Orthopaedics
 Dermatology
 Dental
 Burn Unit
 Infectious Disease
 Dedicated Helipad
 Over 3,750 Biomedical Equipment and Fixtures
 Pharmacy

Advanced medical procedures performed 
Advanced medical procedures performed are as follows:
 Atrial Septal Defect Repair
 AV Canals
 Cardio-Pulmonary Bypass
 Croablation
 Fontan Procedure
 Robotic Surgery to repair some congenital heart defects
 Patent Ductus
 Vascular Ring
 Ross Procedure for aortic valve failure
 Heart Transplant
 Mohs Micrographic Controlled Surgery
 Bariatric Procedures
 Laparoscopic Roux-en-Y Gastric Bypass
 Cerebrovascular Surgery
 Urology and Kidney Transplant

Initial estimates of patient turnover 
Initial estimates of patient turnover are as follows:
 Emergency Department - 50,370 Patients/Year    
 Day hospital treatment unit - 5,720 Patients/Year    
 Dialysis Unit - 3,120 Patients/Year    
 Out Patient Department - 96,720 Patient/Year    
 TOTAL OUTPATIENT/AMBULATORY - 155,930 Patients    
 Adolescent Unit - 1,298 Patients/Year    
 Heart Center - 1,298 Patients/Year    
 Medical Surgical Units (4 Units) - 5,191 Patients/Year    
 Mental Health Unit - 261 Patients/Year    
 Oncology/Cancer Unit - 1,074 Patients/Year    
 Rehabilitation Unit - 209 Patients/Year    
 Neonatal Intensive Care Unit – NICU - Level III Cases - 503 Patients/Year    
 Pediatric Intensive Care Unit – PICU - Including Coronary Care Unit and Burn Unit - 1,501 Patients/Year    
 Nephrology Unit - 403 Patients/Year    
 TOTAL INPATIENT - 11,738 Patients/Year    
 Predicted Average Length Of Stay - 6.2 Days    
 Predicted Number of Operations - 7,710 Operations/Year    
 Day Care Surgery - 6,240 Day Surgery/Year    
 Predicted Imaging & Radiology Investigations and Studies - 44,230 Study + Investigation/Year

Green features 
The hospital has several features to reduce its environmental impact, including:
 Gardens in terraces and the top roof to provide sun insulation
 More than 5,000 square meters of solar panels on the roof and parking structures
 Water treatment and reuse
 A wall façade and HVAC aspiration system to maintain room temperature and reduce energy consumption

Awards 
 Future Projects – Health Award at the World Architecture Festival 2009 
 Hospital Build Award 2011 for Best Sustainable Hospital Project

Hospital dimensions 
The Hospital Dimensions are as follows:
 Hospital Area – 57,965 square meters
 Underground Parking Area – 7,800 square meters
 Above Ground Parking Area – 6,740 square meters
 Inspection and Plants Area – 23,400 square meters
 Outside Greenery Area – 47,685 square meters

References

External links
World Buildings Directory entry

Hospital buildings completed in 2013
Hospitals in Dubai